World Championship Snooker is a sports video game developed by Blade Interactive and published by Codemasters for PlayStation and Microsoft Windows.

Overview
The game featured licenses and likenesses to players from within the top 32 players of the World Snooker Tour. The game allowed players to create an in-game character to play in various modes, including tournaments, on-off matches, and the official world championship. The game also featured a "Master Class" mode, that featured as an in-game tutorial and training mode.

The Master Class mode featured a list of 'lessons', that would teach the player the basics of playing, including ,  and also the rules of the game.

Reception

World Championship Snooker received "mixed or average" reviews, according to review aggregator GameRankings. 

The game went on to become Blade Interactive's best selling boxed title in the UK.

References

External links

2000 video games
Europe-exclusive video games
PlayStation (console) games
World Snooker Championship (series)
Video games developed in the United Kingdom
Windows games